Padalarang is a district in West Bandung Regency, West Java Province, Indonesia.

Kelurahan and villages
Cempakamekar
Ciburuy
Cimerang
Cipeundeuy
Jayamekar
Kertajaya
Kertamulya
Laksanamekar
Padalarang
Tagogapu

Local attractions
Situ Ciburuy
Kota Baru Parahyangan

Toll road access

West Bandung Regency
Districts of West Java
Populated places in West Java

References

See also
West Bandung Regency
Bandung Metropolitan Area